Greenberg Traurig is a multinational law firm founded in Miami in 1967. As of 2022, Greenberg Traurig is the 9th largest law firm in the United States.

The firm has 44 offices in the United States, Latin America, Europe, the Middle East and Asia, and approximately 2650 attorneys worldwide. Their largest office is in New York City.

The firm was founded by Larry J. Hoffman, Mel Greenberg and Robert H. Traurig. It is the ninth largest law firm in the United States by headcount and ranks in the top 20 of the Am Law 100 by gross revenue, in the top 10 of the NLJ 500, and in the top 25 of the Global 200.

History

In the 1970s, Greenberg, Traurig and Hoffman became Greenberg, Traurig, Hoffman, Lipoff, and Quentel with the addition of attorneys Norman H. Lipoff and Albert D. Quentel as named shareholders. The late Florida governor Reubin Askew was a named shareholder in the early 1980s while he also sought the Democratic nomination for president.

Larry Hoffman became managing partner of the firm in 1991, at which point the firm began to expand nationwide, beginning with the opening of an office in New York City. Greenberg Traurig expanded to Chicago, Boston, Los Angeles and Wilmington (Delaware) in 1999; in 2000, the firm doubled the size of its New York City office by acquiring the local office of the defunct Graham & James.

In July 2009 Greenberg Traurig opened an office in London under the name of Greenberg Traurig Maher LLP (since renamed to Greenberg Traurig, LLP).  The London office is currently located in The Shard skyscraper.

According to OpenSecrets, Greenberg Traurig was one of the top law firms contributing to federal candidates during the 2012 election cycle, donating $1.49 million, 50.2% to Democrats.  By comparison, during that same period Akin Gump Strauss Hauer & Feld donated $2.56 million, 66% to Democrats, while oil conglomerate ExxonMobil donated $2.66 million, 88% to Republicans.  Since 1990, Greenberg Traurig contributed $11.2 million to federal campaigns.

In 2013 the firm launched a residency program to hire associates who are not recruited in traditional on-campus interviews by allowing them to spend up to a third of their billable hours in training for a one-year trial period.

In 2016, Brian Duffy became CEO.

In July 2018, founding member Robert Traurig died at age 93 in Miami, Florida.

As of 2022, Greenberg Traurig is the 9th largest law firm in the United States.

Corporate social responsibility 

During 2011-2013, Greenberg Traurig participated in the American Bar Association's National Pro Bono Week.

The Greenberg Traurig Holly Skolnick Fellowship Foundation was established in 1999. The Foundation supports Equal Justice Works public interest lawyers. Previously named the Greenberg Traurig Fellowship Foundation, the program was renamed in 2013 in honor of the late Holly Skolnick, a Greenberg Traurig shareholder who helped establish the foundation and served as its president.

In 2020, Greenberg Traurig became the first law firm certified to be net carbon neutral by the Center for Resource Solutions. In October 2022, they were named a Mansfield Rule 5.0 Certified Plus firm, which requires at least 30% of leadership roles and 30% of staffed lawyers come from historically underrepresented groups.

Finances

Awards and rankings

Controversies 
In January 2001, lobbyist Jack Abramoff left Preston Gates & Ellis to join Greenberg Traurig. At the firm he assembled "Team Abramoff", a lobbying team that was involved in the Jack Abramoff Indian lobbying scandal and the monetary influence of Jack Abramoff.

In 2001, Victor Reyes, who headed the Hispanic Democratic Organization, joined Greenberg Traurig and led the firm's Chicago lobbying practice.  After Reyes's arrival, from 2001 to 2005, Greenberg earned $3.5 million in city-related legal fees, including for representing the city in the United Airlines and RCN Cable TV bankruptcies. US Attorney Patrick Fitzgerald subsequently alleged that Reyes's law office was central to a patronage scheme to funnel city jobs to pro-Daley campaign workers. Reyes resigned from Greenberg in August 2005 and wasn't charged, but prosecutors called him as a "co-schemer" in the indictment. Greenberg CEO César Álvarez stated, "I don't know about anything [Reyes] did in the firm that was wrong. I can only know what I have seen, and I only know that he hasn't been charged".

In May 2005, Philadelphia partner Robert S. Grossman pleaded guilty to charges that he had lied in a 1996 bankruptcy case to cover up his improper diversion of over $100,000 to his personal account when he worked as a real estate developer in Virginia.
	
In June 2006, Greenberg Traurig agreed to pay the Federal Deposit Insurance Corporation $7.6 million for its role as a legal adviser to the now-defunct Hamilton Bank of Miami, to settle allegations that it had helped to cover up bank officers' financial misconduct.  The firm paid an additional $750,000 fine to the Office of the Comptroller of the Currency for allegedly protecting the bank's officers "by making materially false and misleading assertions and by suppressing material evidence".
	
In November 2006, Jay I. Gordon, the former chairman of Greenberg Traurig's tax practice, resigned from the New York bar and was disbarred for taking over $1.2 million in kickbacks on tax shelters that he had recommended to wealthy clients of the firm.
	
In November 2008, a New York State court refused to dismiss a suit alleging that Robert J. Ivanhoe,  head of its real estate group, disregarded his "legal and fiduciary duties" by taking a personal financial stake in a competitor to a client that had invested in a multibillion-dollar real estate venture. The former client had sued Ivanhoe and Greenberg Traurig in April 2008 for breach of fiduciary duty, aiding and abetting breach of fiduciary duty, tortious interference with prospective economic damages, and malpractice. Greenberg Traurig responded that the allegations were "without merit" and that it would appeal the ruling.
	
In December 2008, the firm and several current and former firm attorneys (Harley Lewin and Steven Wadyka) were sued in the U.S. District Court for the Eastern District of Virginia by Catherine and Richard Snyder of Herndon, Virginia.  Also named in the suit, Greenberg Traurig's client, Diane Von Furstenberg Studios, Conde Nast Publications, The New Yorker and New Yorker staff reporter, Larissa MacFarquhar. The Snyders' suit stems from a suit filed in the same court by Diane Von Furstenberg Studios against Catherine Snyder in December 2006 for trademark infringement, which resulted in an award of damages to DVF Studios.
	
In 2014, the Securities and Exchange Commission (SEC) looked into insider trader allegations between United States House Ways and Means Subcommittee on Health staff director Brian Sutter and Mark Hayes, a lobbyist at Greenberg Traurig.  In November, 2015, New York U.S. District Judge Paul Gardephe ordered the Committee and a former staffer to respond to an SEC subpoena request , but he did term the request "overbroad." The SEC sought to determine whether Sutter or anyone else from the Committee tipped off lobbyist Mark Hayes of Greenberg Traurig, which information was then forwarded to Height Securities LLC. Judge Gardephe reasoned that the congressional Speech and Debate Clause does not provide protection for information communicated by a legislative member or aide to a member of the public, and that Sutter's statements to employees of Greenberg are consequently not protected and must be produced. After two years of litigation and its 2nd Circuit appeal of the subpoena in December 2015, the Committee finally dropped its opposition to the order requested by the SEC.

In May 2018, the firm parted ways with Rudy Giuliani over his allegations that he would pay his clients' adversaries hush money in a manner consistent with the Stormy Daniels affair.  Mr. Giuliani suggested that such payments were common, even without the knowledge of the clients.

See also
Akerman LLP
Shutts & Bowen

External links 
Official website
Organizational profile at The National Law Review

References 

Law firms established in 1967
Lobbying firms
Law firms based in Miami
1967 establishments in Florida
International law organizations
American companies established in 1967
Foreign law firms with offices in the Netherlands